Maass or Maaß is a German surname. People with this surname include:

Clara Maass (1876–1901), American nurse
G. F. H. Maass (1830–1901), German botanist
Gustav Maass (1893–1964), American architect 
Hans Maass (1911–1992), German mathematician 
Hermann Maaß (1897–1944), resistance fighter
Johann Maass (1766–1823), German psychologist
Leberecht Maass (1863–1914), German admiral 
Peter Maass (born 1960), American journalist
Verena Butalikakis (née Maass; 1955–2018), German politician

See also 
 Mas (disambiguation)
 Maas (disambiguation)
 Maß
 Maes (disambiguation)
 Maus

Surnames
Low German surnames
Surnames of German origin
German-language surnames